The 2003–04 NBA season was the Hornets' second season in the National Basketball Association. During the offseason, the Hornets signed free agent Steve Smith. Despite losing Jamal Mashburn for the first 44 games due to a knee injury, the Hornets got off to a solid 17–7 start to the season under new head coach Tim Floyd. However, they would struggle posting a losing record in January, and only managed to play .500 ball in February. Mashburn would return to play just 19 games averaging 20.8 points per game, but then re-injured his knee sitting out the rest of the season. The Hornets struggled losing 11 of their 16 games in March, but would rebound in April winning 4 of 7 games.

Despite posting an average record of 41–41, the Hornets finished fifth in the Eastern Conference, and qualified for their fifth straight playoff appearance. This was also the team's final season in the NBA's Eastern Conference. Baron Davis was again hampered by injuries and he played just 67 games. Despite another injury-plagued season, Davis and teammate Jamaal Magloire both represented the Eastern Conference at the 2004 NBA All-Star Game in Los Angeles.

In the playoffs, they faced the Miami Heat in the first round, but lost in seven games. Following the season, the Hornets moved to the new Southwest Division of the NBA's Western Conference. Also following the season, Floyd was fired as coach after just one season, Smith left in the 2004 NBA Expansion Draft, Stacey Augmon signed as a free agent with the Orlando Magic, and Robert Traylor re-signed with the Cleveland Cavaliers.

Draft picks

Roster

Roster Notes
 Point guard Courtney Alexander missed the entire season due to a ruptured Achilles tendon.

Regular season

Season standings

Record vs. opponents

Game log

Playoffs

|- align="center" bgcolor="#ffcccc"
| 1
| April 18
| @ Miami
| L 79–81
| Baron Davis (17)
| Brown, Magloire (11)
| Augmon, Davis (4)
| American Airlines Arena20,102
| 0–1
|- align="center" bgcolor="#ffcccc"
| 2
| April 21
| @ Miami
| L 63–93
| Baron Davis (13)
| Jamaal Magloire (10)
| Baron Davis (7)
| American Airlines Arena20,189
| 0–2
|- align="center" bgcolor="#ccffcc"
| 3
| April 24
| Miami
| W 77–71
| Baron Davis (21)
| Brown, Lynch (11)
| Baron Davis (5)
| New Orleans Arena14,251
| 1–2
|- align="center" bgcolor="#ccffcc"
| 4
| April 27
| Miami
| W 96–85
| Baron Davis (23)
| Brown, West (7)
| Baron Davis (10)
| New Orleans Arena16,009
| 2–2
|- align="center" bgcolor="#ffcccc"
| 5
| April 30
| @ Miami
| L 83–87
| Baron Davis (33)
| P. J. Brown (13)
| Baron Davis (7)
| American Airlines Arena20,147
| 2–3
|- align="center" bgcolor="#ccffcc"
| 6
| May 2
| Miami
| W 89–83
| Brown, Lynch (16)
| Brown, Magloire (9)
| Baron Davis (12)
| New Orleans Arena17,297
| 3–3
|- align="center" bgcolor="#ffcccc"
| 7
| May 4
| @ Miami
| L 77–85
| Steve Smith (25)
| Jamaal Magloire (10)
| Davis, Williams (4)
| American Airlines Arena20,286
| 3–4
|-

Player statistics

Season

Playoffs

Awards and records
Baron Davis, All-NBA Third Team

Transactions

Trades

Free agents

References

New Orleans Hornets on Basketball Reference

New Orleans Hornets seasons